Ottavio Barone (born 29 September 1974) is an Italian boxer. He competed in the men's middleweight event at the 2000 Summer Olympics.

References

External links
 

1974 births
Living people
Italian male boxers
Olympic boxers of Italy
Boxers at the 2000 Summer Olympics
Boxers from Rome
Middleweight boxers